The Heptageniidae (synonym: Ecdyonuridae) are a family of mayflies with over 500 described species mainly distributed in the Holarctic, Oriental, and Afrotropical regions, and also present in the Central American Tropics and extreme northern South America. The group is sometimes referred to as flat-headed mayflies or stream mayflies. These are generally rather small mayflies with three long tails. The wings are usually clear with prominent venation although species with variegated wings are known. As in most mayflies, the males have large compound eyes, but not divided into upper and lower parts.

Heptageniids breed mainly in fast-flowing streams, but some species use still waters. The nymphs have a flattened shape and are usually dark in colour. They use a wide range of food sources with herbivorous, scavenging, and predatory species known.

The oldest described member of the family is Amerogenia from the Late Cretaceous (Turonian) aged New Jersey amber.

References

Fauna Europaea
Nomina Insecta Nearctica

Mayflies
Insect families